The 1994 European Parliament election in Spain was held on Sunday, 12 June 1994, as part of the EU-wide election to elect the 4th European Parliament. All 64 seats allocated to Spain as per Council Decision 93/81/Euratom, ECSC, EEC were up for election. The election was held simultaneously with a regional election in Andalusia.

The landslide victory for the People's Party (PP) became the first PP win over the Spanish Socialist Workers' Party (PSOE) in a nationwide election.

Electoral system
The 64 members of the European Parliament allocated to Spain as per Council Decision 93/81/Euratom, ECSC, EEC were elected using the D'Hondt method and a closed list proportional representation, with no electoral threshold being applied in order to be entitled to enter seat distribution. However, the use of the D'Hondt method might result in an effective threshold depending on the district magnitude. Seats were allocated to a single multi-member constituency comprising the entire national territory. Voting was on the basis of universal suffrage, which comprised all nationals and resident non-national European citizens over 18 years of age and in full enjoyment of their political rights.

The electoral law provided that parties, federations, coalitions and groupings of electors were allowed to present lists of candidates. However, they were required to secure the signature of at least 15,000 registered electors. Electors were barred from signing for more than one list of candidates. Parties, federations and coalitions were allowed to replace this requirement with the signature of at least 50 elected officials—deputies, senators, MEPs or members from the legislative assemblies of autonomous communities or from local city councils—. Concurrently, parties and federations intending to enter in coalition to take part jointly at an election were required to inform the relevant Electoral Commission within ten days from the election call.

Parties and coalitions
Below is a list of the main parties and coalitions which contested the election:

Opinion polls
The table below lists voting intention estimates in reverse chronological order, showing the most recent first and using the dates when the survey fieldwork was done, as opposed to the date of publication. Where the fieldwork dates are unknown, the date of publication is given instead. The highest percentage figure in each polling survey is displayed with its background shaded in the leading party's colour. If a tie ensues, this is applied to the figures with the highest percentages. The "Lead" column on the right shows the percentage-point difference between the parties with the highest percentages in a given poll. When available, seat projections are also displayed below the voting estimates in a smaller font.

Results

Overall

Distribution by European group

Elected legislators
The following table lists the elected legislators:

Notes

References
Opinion poll sources

Other

External links
European elections Spain in Europe Politique.

Spain
1994
European Parliament